Duna is the Hungarian name for the Danube River. 

Other places with the name Duna include:
D'Una River, Brazil
Duna (woreda), Hadiya Zone, Ethiopia
Duna, Iran (disambiguation), places in Iran
23617 Duna, main-belt asteroid discovered in 1996

Duna may also refer to:
Duna TV, Hungarian television station
Duna World, Hungarian television station and sister channel of Duna TV
Duna or Dyna, the Viking name, or Düna, the German name for the Daugava (river) (flowing through Russia, Belarus, and Latvia)
Duna (band), Soviet band of the late 1980s
Duna Records, American record label founded by Brant Bjork
Fiat Duna, small car produced in Brazil
Duna language, spoken in Papua New Guinea
Duna people, indigenous people living in Papua New Guinea

People with the given name or surname Duna include:
Steffi Duna, Hungarian actress

See also
Doona, Australian term for duvet or comforter
 Duna, name for a Mars analog in the game Kerbal Space Program